Treaty of Brömsebro may refer to one of two treaties between Denmark-Norway and Sweden:

First Treaty of Brömsebro (1541)
Second Treaty of Brömsebro (1645) also known as the Peace of Brömsebro

da:Freden i Brömsebro
de:Frieden von Brömsebro
et:Brömsebro rahu
es:Tratado de Brömsebro
fr:Traité de Brömsebro
it:Trattato di Brömsebro
hu:Brömsebroi béke
nl:Vrede van Brömsebro
ja:ブレムセブルー条約
no:Freden i Brömsebro
nn:Freden i Brömsebro
pt:Paz de Brömsebro
ru:Брёмсебруский мир
fi:Brömsebron rauha
sv:Freden i Brömsebro